South Arabian may refer to:
something of, from, or related to the region of South Arabia 
Modern South Arabian languages, a group of languages presently spoken in Yemen and Oman
Old South Arabian languages, a mostly extinct group of languages spoken in what is now Yemen
Ancient South Arabian script, the writing system of Old South Arabian

Language and nationality disambiguation pages